Benjamin Michael Bennett IV (born February 24, 1993) is a former American football defensive tackle. He played college football at Ohio State.

Early years
Bennett attended Centerville High School in Centerville, Ohio, where he was a first-team Division I All-Ohio performer who played in the U.S. Army All-American Bowl. He was a two-time Greater Western Ohio Conference player of the year and served as team captain for coach Ron Ullery's 2010 Centerville team that went 9-3 and reached the regional semifinals.

Bennett was also a top competitor in track & field. In 2011, Bennett’s final throw of 19.48 meters (63 feet, 11 inches) in the shot put at the Division I track and field meet was enough to vault him to a state title at his future home on the Ohio State University campus. He followed up with a second-place finish in the discus with a toss of 56.50 meters (185 feet, 4 inches). He had top-throws of 19.80 meters (64 feet, 11.5 inches) in the shot put, 59.83 meters (196 feet, 3 inches) in the discus and 53.21 meters (174 feet, 6 inches) in the hammer at Centerville.

College career
As a true freshman in 2011, Bennett played in all 13 games, recording 17 tackles and three quarterback sacks. As a sophomore in 2012, Bennett played in only eight games due to injury. As a junior in 2013, Bennett started all 13 games, recording 44 tackles and 7.5 sacks.

Professional career
Bennett, who was unable to work out at the 2015 NFL Combine due to injury, pulled up on his 40-yard dash attempt at Ohio State's Pro Day with a hamstring problem. The injury forced him to withdraw from the other on-field drills.

Jacksonville Jaguars
On May 2, 2015, Bennett was drafted by the Jacksonville Jaguars with the 180th overall pick in the sixth round of the 2015 NFL Draft. In 13 games of his rookie season, Bennett recorded ten tackles and half a sack.

On September 3, 2016, Bennett was placed on injured reserve.

On September 19, 2017, Bennett was again placed on injured reserve after suffering a pectoral injury.

On September 11, 2018, Bennett was released by the Jaguars.

Atlanta Falcons
On October 2, 2018, Bennett signed with the Atlanta Falcons. He was waived on October 30, 2018. He signed a reserve/future contract with the Falcons on January 10, 2019. 

On July 22, 2019, Bennett suffered a dislocated ankle and was placed on injured reserve.

References

External links
Atlanta Falcons bio
Ohio State Buckeyes bio

1993 births
Atlanta Falcons players
Living people
Players of American football from Dayton, Ohio
American football defensive tackles
Ohio State Buckeyes football players
Jacksonville Jaguars players